Strange Toys is a fantasy novel written by Patricia Geary and published in 1987. It won the Philip K. Dick Award that year.

1987 American novels
American fantasy novels
Bantam Spectra books